The Tyrrell 020 was a Formula One racing car designed by Harvey Postlethwaite and George Ryton for Tyrrell Racing and raced during the  season.

Overview

1991 
The 020 was driven by Satoru Nakajima who brought the Honda engine contract with him and also by Stefano Modena. Its best result was a second place by Modena in the Canadian Grand Prix. Tyrrell scored 12 points to finish 6th in the Constructors' Championship with half the points scored by Modena's 2nd in Canada.

1992 
The car was updated for the  season and was dubbed the 020B. For this season the Honda V10 was replaced with the  Ilmor LH10 V10 engine and was driven by Olivier Grouillard and veteran Andrea de Cesaris. The team only scored 8 points for the season but again finished in 6th place.

1993 
The 020 was pressed into service again for the first nine races of the  season. Again updated it was called the 020C. For the third time in three years the car ran a V10 engine but this time it carried the  Yamaha OX10A. It was driven again by De Cesaris who was joined by Japanese driver Ukyo Katayama. Neither driver would score a World Championship point driving the car.

The Tyrrell 020C was replaced by the 021 midway through the 1993 season.

Complete Formula One results
(key)

References

Tyrrell Formula One cars